The Rothmans Connaught Hard Court Championships also known simply as the Connaught Hard Courts was a combined men's and women's clay court tennis tournament founded in 1951. The championships were organised by the Connaught Lawn Tennis Club, Chingford, Essex, England. The tournament ran until 1974.

History
The Connaught Hard Court Championships, were established in 1951 as an open tournament held at the Connaught Lawn Tennis Club (f.1885), Chingford, Essex, England. The tournament was continually staged until 1974. The tournament was sponsored by the tobacco company Rothmans International from 1971 to 1974.

Notable winners of the men's singles title included; Tony Mottram, Jack Arkinstall, Torben Ulrich, Sven Davidson, Lew Hoad, Rod Laver, Jaroslav Drobný, and Owen Davidson. Previous winners of women's singles title included; Doris Hart, Angela Mortimer, Christine Truman, Norma Baylon, Ann Haydon Jones, Virginia Wade, and  Dianne Fromholtz.

References

Defunct tennis tournaments in the United Kingdom
Clay court tennis tournaments